Alpullu station is a station in Alpullu, Turkey.

History
The station was opened in 1926, by the Oriental Railway.

Services
TCDD Taşımacılık operates two daily trains, both from Istanbul, that stop at Alpullu, one international intercity train, to Bucharest or Sofia, and one regional train to Kapıkule.

Between July 2005 and February 2011 the Friendship Express, (an international InterCity train jointly operated by the Turkish State Railways (TCDD) and TrainOSE linking Istanbul's Sirkeci Terminal, Turkey and Thessaloniki, Greece) made scheduled stops at Alpullu.

References

External links
 
Station timetable

Railway stations in Kırklareli Province
Railway stations opened in 1926
1926 establishments in Turkey
Babaeski District